Matej Kováč (born 14 December 1985) is a Slovak football midfielder who currently plays for ŠK Prašník.

References

External links
Corgoň Liga profile

Eurofotbal profile

1985 births
Living people
Slovak footballers
Association football midfielders
Spartak Myjava players
FC Senec players
ŠK Senec players
FC DAC 1904 Dunajská Streda players
Slovak Super Liga players